Songs of the Lincoln Brigade is a 1940 album by several members of the Almanac Singers: Baldwin 'Butch' Hawes, Bess Lomax Hawes and Pete Seeger, along with Tom Glazer. The album presents "the songs of the men who left home and safety behind them in 1937 to fight Fascism" in Spain.

Track listing

References 

Almanac Singers albums
1944 albums
Spanish Civil War poems